Ischilín Department is a  department of Córdoba Province in Argentina.

The provincial subdivision has a population of about 30,105 inhabitants in an area of 5,123 km², and its capital city is Deán Funes, which is located around 834 km from Capital Federal.

Settlements
 Avellaneda
 Cañada de Río Pinto
 Chuña
 Copacabana
 Deán Funes
 Los Pozos 
 Olivares de San Nicolás
 Quilino
 Villa Gutiérrez

Departments of Córdoba Province, Argentina